Greaves may refer to:

Greave, armour that protects the leg (military)
Greaves (crater), a lunar crater near the southwest edge of Mare Crisium
Greaves (food), an edible by-product of the rendering process
Greaves (surname), people with the surname

See also
Greeves (disambiguation)
Grieves (disambiguation)